The old Governor's house in Medan is a historic mansion that was used by the resident during the Dutch East Indies and remains an example of colonial architecture in Medan, East Sumatra, Indonesia.

The building is currently used as the Medan branch office of the Standard Chartered Bank and is within the grounds of Hotel Danau Toba.

Gallery

See also
Colonial architecture of Medan
Medan Club

References

Buildings and structures in Medan
Houses in Indonesia